Garbina may refer to:

 Garbina, Poland, a village in the Warmian-Masurian Voivodeship
 Garbina, Croatia, a village near Poreč